Muzimes is a genus of blister beetles belonging to the family Meloidae.

Species
 Muzimes collaris (Fabricius, 1787)
 Muzimes dersimensis (Kaszab)
 Muzimes obenbergeri (Kaszab)
 Muzimes sterbai (Maran)
 Muzimes tauricus (Maran)

References

Meloidae